British Columbia Highway 101, also known as the Sunshine Coast Highway, is the main north-south thoroughfare on the Sunshine Coast, British Columbia, Canada.

Highway 101, which first opened in 1962, is divided into two separate land segments, with a ferry link in between. The highway is maintained by Capilano Highway Services. Despite its location on the mainland, the highway is unique for not being connected to the rest of the British Columbia highway system. Access to the highway can only be obtained by taking ferries from Horseshoe Bay to the south end in Gibsons or Comox to Powell River. Highway 101 between Langdale and Powell River is designated as a feeder route  of the Canadian National Highway System.

Route description

The highway begins in the south at the BC Ferries terminal at Langdale, which connects the Sunshine Coast to Vancouver via a ferry route across Howe Sound to Horseshoe Bay. The ferry link across the Jervis Inlet lasts  between Earls Cove to the south and Saltery Bay to the north. The  northern land section of Highway 101 includes, from southeast to northwest, the hamlets of Stillwater and Lang Bay, the city of Powell River, the Tla'amin Nation and the community of Lund, at the northern terminus of the highway.

Fixed link proposals

The provincial government has conducted several feasibility studies on connecting Highway 101 to the Lower Mainland, as well as replacing the Earls Cove–Saltery Bay ferry. A study launched by the BC Liberal government in 2015 identified four proposals costing between $2.1 billion and $4.4 billion:

 A  extension of Highway 101 along the west shore of Howe Sound that would connect to Highway 99 near Squamish.
 A  extension of Highway 101 across Howe Sound on a pair of suspension bridges via the Anvil Island, with a connection to Highway 99 near Lions Bay. The Islands Trust opposes this option.
 A new  highway connecting Powell River to Squamish with a pair of tunnels under the Coast Mountains.
 A  highway link between the two sections of Highway 101 eliminating the ferry between Saltery Bay and Earls Cove via a pair of suspension bridges.

All four options were considered feasible, with positive cost to benefit ratios for the two bridge options. The study was inconclusive and recommended further analysis of the four options. The NDP government announced in December 2017 that the study would not move forward due to technical and financial issues.

Major intersections

From south to north:

References

External links

101
Coast of British Columbia
Sunshine Coast (British Columbia)